Tigh Ab may refer to:
 Tigab
 Tighanab (disambiguation)